Stùc a' Chroin ('cloven hoof peak') is a mountain in the Breadalbane region of the southern Scottish Highlands. It lies a short distance south of Ben Vorlich and east of Strathyre. The boundary between the council areas of Perth and Kinross and Stirling passes through the summit of the peak, and the town of Callander lies to the south.

Stùc a' Chroin is most often climbed together with Ben Vorlich from Ardvorlich on Loch Earnside to the north. The normal routes of ascent is over the summit of Ben Vorlich and down its south west ridge to the Bealach an Dubh Choirein. From this bealach a series of rough paths cut very steeply up the right side of the prominent buttress, involving scrambling, to the summit of Stùc a' Chroin. Returning from the bealach, Ben Vorlich can be skirted utilising a faint, boggy path traversing the grassy slopes on its north west, eventually re-joining the initial ascent path.

An alternative is from Ardchullarie on Loch Lubnaig up the forest path to the head of Glen Ample and over Beinn Each, a Corbett. The linking ridge is very rough and rocky. On return, the open west slopes of Beinn Each can be descended, encountering the remarkable eggbox terrain of a large rock slope failure (see Lochearnhead, Glen Ample)

A longer, unfrequented route of ascent to Stùc a' Chroin from Arivurichardich ascends the mountain's south east ridge.

References

 The Munros, SMC Hillwalkers Guide: Donald Bennett et al.: 

Munros
Marilyns of Scotland
Mountains and hills of the Southern Highlands
Mountains and hills of Perth and Kinross
Mountains and hills of Stirling (council area)